Finland was represented by Markku Aro and Koivistolaiset (sisters Anja and Anneli Koivisto), with the song "Tie uuteen päivään", at the 1971 Eurovision Song Contest, which took place on 13 April in Dublin.

Before Eurovision

National final
The Finnish national final was held on 13th February at the YLE TV Studios in Helsinki, hosted by Eveliina Pokela and Reijo Salminen. The winner was chosen by a jury consisting of 30 people.

At Eurovision
On the night of the final Markku Aro and Koivistolaiset performed 17th in the running order, following Yugoslavia and preceding Norway. The entry was conducted by Ossi Runne. At the close of voting, Finland picked up 84 points and placed 8th of the 18 entries.

Voting

Sources
Viisukuppila, Muistathan: Suomen karsinnat 1971 
Finnish national final 1971 on natfinals

1971
Countries in the Eurovision Song Contest 1971
Eurovision